The Mumbai Skywalk Project is a series of skyways for pedestrian use in the Mumbai Metropolitan Region. The skywalks connect Mumbai Suburban Railway stations or other high-concentration commercial areas with various heavily targeted destinations. The purpose of the skywalks is efficient dispersal of commuters from congested areas to strategic locations, such as bus stations, taxi stands, shopping areas, etc. and vice versa.

The first skywalk was inaugurated on 24 June 2008. There are 36 skywalks in the Mumbai Metropolitan Region. The average daily foot count for 23 skywalks in August 2010 was estimated at 565,000.

History

Mumbai's Suburban Railway already has one of the highest passenger densities of any urban railway system in the world. With almost 7 million passengers using the system daily, as well as the associated transport interchanges in their vicinity (bus stations, taxi stands, autorickshaw stands, car parks, etc.) the suburban railway stations are the most congested areas of the city. The problem is further aggravated by the presence of hawkers and parked vehicles, making the commute hazardous for pedestrians. In 2007, the Mumbai Metropolitan Region Development Authority (MMRDA) conceived the idea of skywalks in response to these problems.

MMRDA planned to build 50 skywalks in the first phase, ranging from 1 to 2 miles in length. The first 18 skywalks were to be built by the Maharashtra State Road Development Corporation (MSRDC). Following feedback and criticism of some of the skywalks based on the proposed routes or other conflicting development plans, 17 of these were cancelled and others added.

The proposed Mahim East skywalk was challenged by the Mahim Skywalk Protest Committee. MMRDA announced in June 2009 that it was cancelling the proposed Mahim East skywalk due to "alignment conflicts with the Dharavi Redevelopment Project".

The first Skywalk was completed in June 2008 from Bandra station to Kalanagar Junction, measuring 1.3 km. It is used by over 100,000 pedestrians daily.

MMRDA recovered some of the cost of maintenance through the sale of advertising space on the walkways.

Skywalks

There are currently 37 skywalks in Mumbai Metropolitan Region.

References
8. Siddha Sky – Located at Wadala, Mumbai, having longest rooftop skywalk.

Skyways
Transport in Mumbai
2008 establishments in Maharashtra
Transport infrastructure completed in 2008